Sir John Stirling Ainsworth (30 January 1844 – 24 May 1923) was an English industrialist, banker and Liberal politician.

Family and education
Ainsworth was the son of Thomas Ainsworth of Cleator Moor, Cumberland. His mother was Mary Laurie, daughter of John Stirling, a Doctor of Divinity from Craigie in East Ayrshire. He was educated at University College School, London and at University College, London where he obtained MA and LL.B degrees. In 1879 he married Margaret Catherine daughter of Robert Reid Macredie. They had one son and two daughters. His wife died in 1918. His brother, David Ainsworth (1842–1906) was Liberal Member of Parliament for West Cumberland from 1880 to 1885 and for Egremont from 1892 to 1895.

Career
Ainsworth had interests in the iron mines and related industries in Cumberland. He was Chairman of the Cleator and Workington Junction Railway. He was also involved in banking, being a director of the Whitehaven Joint Stock Bank  which later merged with Parr's Bank, of which Ainsworth then became director of the Cumberland and Westmoreland local board.

Politics
Ainsworth contested the Barrow-in-Furness constituency at the 1886 general election. He faced the sitting Member of Parliament, William Sproston Caine who had been elected earlier that year in a by-election as a Liberal but had switched to the Liberal Unionist Party. Ainsworth did not fight the general elections of 1892 or 1895 but in 1900 he was chosen to contest Argyllshire. He did not win but got the chance to fight the seat again in 1903 at a by-election when the sitting member, Donald Ninian Nicol, died.  

At the by-election, which was held on 26 August 1903, Ainsworth won in a straight fight against a Unionist candidate, Mr. C Stewart, by a majority of 1,586 votes. Whilst an MP he voted in favour of the 1908 Women's Enfranchisement Bill. He held the seat until 1918 when he stood down from Parliament.

Other public service
Ainsworth was High Sheriff of Cumberland in 1891  and was later Deputy Lieutenant of Cumberland  and of Argyllshire. He commanded the 3rd Volunteer Battalion, the Border Regiment from 1898 to November 1902, and received the honorary rank of colonel as he retired. He also served as a Justice of the Peace in Cumberland.  He was created a baronet in 1917. In 1910 he was a member of the Royal Commission on Mines.

Death
Ainsworth died on 24 May 1923, aged 79 years.

See also
Ainsworth baronets
List of baronetcies in the baronetage of the United Kingdom
List of Old Gowers

References

External links 
 

1844 births
1923 deaths
Baronets in the Baronetage of the United Kingdom
High Sheriffs of Cumberland
Scottish Liberal Party MPs
Members of the Parliament of the United Kingdom for Highland constituencies
Alumni of University College London
UK MPs 1900–1906
UK MPs 1906–1910
UK MPs 1910
UK MPs 1910–1918
English bankers
English industrialists
English justices of the peace
People from Cleator Moor
Politics of Cumbria
People educated at University College School
Deputy Lieutenants of Argyllshire
Deputy Lieutenants of Cumberland